Tillard is an English surname. Notable people with the surname include:

Charles Tillard (1851–1954), English cricketer
Conrad Tillard (born 1964), American Baptist minister, radio host, author, activist, and politician
Elliot Tillard (1880–1967), English first-class cricketer
James Tillard, first person to land on Sabrina Island in the Azores
John Tillard (1924–2019), former English cricketer
Violet Tillard (1874−1922), English suffragette, nurse and pacifist

English-language surnames